San Saturnino is a locality located in the municipality of Bierge, in Huesca province, Aragon, Spain. As of 2020, it has a population of 3.

Geography 
San Saturnino is located 58km east-northeast of Huesca.

References

Populated places in the Province of Huesca